Akara is an island of the New Georgia archipelago in the Western Province, Solomon Islands in the South Pacific, east of Papua New Guinea.

Geography
The island is located in the Blanche Channel, a waterway in the southeastern part of the archipelago that separates the islands of New Georgia and Vangunu in the northeast from the islands of Rendova and Tetepare in the southwest. Akara is separated from the southern foothills of New Georgia by a narrow waterway. The island is uninhabited.

References

External links
 http://www.tetepare.org/

Islands of the Solomon Islands
Western Province (Solomon Islands)